The Bonstelle Theatre is a theater and former synagogue owned by Wayne State University, located at 3424 Woodward Avenue (the southeast corner of Woodward and Eliot) in the Midtown Woodward Historic District of Detroit, Michigan. It was built in 1902 as the Temple Beth-El, and was listed on the National Register of Historic Places in 1982. , the Bonstelle is planned to be renovated and integrated into a newly-constructed hotel.

Construction
When Rabbi Leo M. Franklin first began leading services at Detroit's Temple Beth El in 1899, he felt that the construction of a new temple building on Detroit's "Piety Row" stretch of Woodward would increase the visibility and prestige of Detroit's Jewish community. Accordingly, in October 1900, the congregation held a special meeting at which it was decided to build a new temple. The congregation purchased a site for the new temple in April of the next year and engaged member Albert Kahn to design the structure. Groundbreaking took place on November 25, 1901, with the ceremonial cornerstone laid on April 23, 1902. The first services were held in the chapel on January 24, 1903, and the formal dedication was held on September 18–19 of the same year.

Building
The temple is a Beaux-Arts structure influenced primarily by Roman and Greek temples. Architect Albert Kahn's exterior design for Temple Beth-El has been compared closely to the Pantheon in Rome. There is a prominent dome over the main area of the temple, with gabled wings on the north and south. A pedimented extension on the front once extended into a porch; the front section of the building was lost when the city widened Woodward Avenue in 1936.

Later use
When the Temple Beth El congregation constructed a new building farther north along Woodward in 1922, they sold the building at Woodward and Eliot to Jessie Bonstelle for $500,000. Bonstelle hired architect C. Howard Crane to convert the building into a theater, and named the resulting building the Bonstelle Playhouse. In 1928, the Bonstelle Playhouse became the Detroit Civic Theatre, and in the 1930s, the Mayfair Motion Picture Theater. In 1951, Wayne State University rented the facility as a performance space for its theater company, and purchased it outright in 1956, renaming it the Bonstelle Theatre in honor of Jessie Bonstelle.

In 2019, the University reached an agreement to lease the theatre to Detroit-based development firm The Roxbury Group. The Bonstelle is planned to be renovated and integrated into an adjacent hotel by AC Hotels, which is expected to open in 2024. The Bonstelle was expected to host Mary Poppins as its final performance in April 2020, which was cancelled due to the COVID-19 pandemic. As a result, the final performance by Wayne State University in the Bonstelle was A Christmas Carol in December 2019. The University plans to replace both the Bonstelle and the Hilberry Theatre with the Hilberry Gateway, opening in April 2023.

Gallery

See also

 History of the Jews in Metro Detroit

References

Further reading

External links

Bonstelle Theatre - Wayne State University
Photographs from the Rabbi Leo M. Franklin archives: these include photographs c. 1903 - 1922 of both the interior and exterior of the structure.

Wayne State University
Theatres in Detroit
Midtown Detroit
Woodward Avenue
Former synagogues in the United States
Jews and Judaism in Detroit
Synagogues completed in 1902
Historic district contributing properties in Michigan
National Register of Historic Places in Detroit
Properties of religious function on the National Register of Historic Places in Michigan
Event venues established in 1922
1922 establishments in Michigan
Albert Kahn (architect) buildings
Beaux-Arts architecture in Michigan
Former religious buildings and structures in Michigan
Synagogue buildings with domes